Kim Lammers (born 21 April 1981) is a Dutch field hockey player who plays as an attacker for Dutch club Laren. She also plays for the Netherlands national team. She was part of the Dutch squad that became world champions at the 2006 Women's Hockey World Cup and part of the Dutch team that won the gold medal at the 2012 Summer Olympics.

In 2021, she appeared in the television show De Verraders.

References

External links 
 
 Profile 

1981 births
Living people
Dutch female field hockey players
Field hockey players at the 2012 Summer Olympics
Lesbian sportswomen
Dutch LGBT sportspeople
Olympic field hockey players of the Netherlands
Olympic gold medalists for the Netherlands
Olympic medalists in field hockey
Field hockey players from Amsterdam
LGBT field hockey players
Medalists at the 2012 Summer Olympics
20th-century Dutch women
21st-century Dutch women